Harpalus cephalotes is a species of ground beetle in the subfamily Harpalinae. It was described by Fairmaire & Laboulbene in 1854.

References

cephalotes
Beetles described in 1854